Becky Briggs (born 2 March 2000) is a British long-distance runner. She competed in the women's half marathon at the 2020 World Athletics Half Marathon Championships held in Gdynia, Poland.

Career 

In 2019, she competed in the junior women's race at the IAAF World Cross Country Championships held in Aarhus, Denmark. In 2020, she won the Bath Half Marathon held in Bath, United Kingdom.

She competed at the 2021 British Athletics Marathon and 20km Walk Trial held in Kew Gardens, London hoping to qualify for the 2020 Summer Olympics in Tokyo, Japan.

Achievements

References

External links 
 
 

2000 births
Living people
Place of birth missing (living people)
British female cross country runners
British female long-distance runners
21st-century British women